Rosemary Thomas (February 16, 1901 – April 7, 1961) was an American poet and teacher, known for her book of poems Immediate Sun, which won the Twayne First Book Contest in 1951.

Education 
Thomas graduated from Smith College in 1923. In 1950, she received a Master of Arts degree from Columbia University for an essay on Lawrence Durrell, the British poet and novelist.

She taught creative writing at various schools including Spence School and Brearley School in New York, Shipley School in Bryn Mawr, Pennsylvania and Oxford School in Hartford, Connecticut.

Literary career
In 1951, Thomas won the Twayne First Book Contest for her only book of poems, Immediate Sun. The book had a foreword written by Archibald MacLeish, who described her poems as having "a common quality, a characteristic idiom, and inflection the reader would recognize again as a man recognizes the inflection of a decisive voice". The book includes a poem about her brother-in-law, Canadian tennis star J.F. Foulkes, entitled "The Colonel". 
Her poems were also published in the New York Times, The New Yorker, and in other magazines.

The final years of her life, which she devoted entirely to her writing, were divided between her homes in Duxbury, Massachusetts, and New York City, where she died in 1961.

Legacy
A posthumous collection of her poems was published in 1968, titled Selected Poems of Rosemary Thomas, with a foreword by Mark van Doren. He wrote: "Rosemary Thomas's poems will last, as all things excellent do, for the simple reason that nothing like them exists elsewhere."

In 2004, her poem "The Elephants Pass Carnegie Hall" was set to music by composer David Leisner in his piece A Timeless Procession. It was first performed in 2011 at Symphony Space in New York City. The program for the performance records that Leisner discovered Thomas's poems by chance at a library book sale in the late 1980s. He describes her as a "lyrical, imaginative, spiritual-minded poet whose work simply begged me to set it to music".

The English Language and Literature Department at Smith College awards the Rosemary Thomas Poetry Prize annually to the best poem or group of poems.

References

External links
 Selected Poems of Rosemary Thomas at Google Books
 Rosemary Thomas papers, 1930–1966 at Columbia University Libraries
 Search results for Rosemary Thomas, poems published in the New Yorker between 1954 and 1961

1901 births
1961 deaths
American women poets
20th-century American poets
20th-century American women writers
Smith College alumni
Columbia University alumni
Poets from Massachusetts
Poets from New York (state)
Schoolteachers from Pennsylvania
Schoolteachers from New York (state)
People from Duxbury, Massachusetts
Schoolteachers from Connecticut
Writers from New York City
20th-century American educators
20th-century American women educators
The New Yorker people